2008–09 Bosnia and Herzegovina Football Cup was the fourteenth season of the Bosnia and Herzegovina's annual football cup, and a ninth season of the unified competition. The competition started on September 24, 2008 with the First Round and got concluded on May 28, 2009 with the Final.

First round
Thirty-two teams entered in the First Round. The draw was held on September 11 while the matches were played on September 24, 2008.

|}

Second round
The draw for the Second Round was conducted on September 23, 2008. The matches were played on October 1 (first legs) and October 8, 2008 (second legs).

|}

Quarterfinals
The draw for the Quarterfinals was conducted on October 21, 2008. The matches were played on October 29 (first legs) and November 12, 2008 (second legs).

|}

Semifinals
The matches were played on March 25 (first legs) and April 15, 2009 (second legs).

|}

Final

Second leg

Slavija 2–2 Sloboda on aggregate. Slavija won 4–3 on penalties.

External links
Statistics on RSSSF
 Official site 

Bosnia and Herzegovina Football Cup seasons
Cup
Bosnia